The Makmal gold mine is an open-pit gold mine in Toguz-Toro District, Jalal-Abad Region, Kyrgyzstan, just to the south of Kazarman.  It was the largest gold mine in the Soviet Union.

The mine is currently run by the Makmal gold mining combine, or Makmalaltyn, a branch of Kyrgyzaltyn (a publicly traded company), and has an output of close to 1.2 tonnes of gold per year.

References

Geography of Kyrgyzstan
Economy of Kyrgyzstan
Gold mines in Kyrgyzstan
Jalal-Abad Region
Gold mines in the Soviet Union
Surface mines in Kyrgyzstan